Pegasus is the name of several ships and ship-types:
 , the name of a paddle steamer which sank in 1843
 , the name of nine Royal Navy ships
 , the name of two United States Navy ships 
 , a US Navy type of fast attack patrol boat

Pegasus